Yusufi may refer to:
 Yusufzai, a major tribe of Pashtuns
 Mushtaq Ahmad Yusufi, an Urdu satirical and humor writer
 Mohammed Nabi Yusufi, an Afghani community leader and Imam